Jean-Thomas Taschereau  may refer to:

 Jean-Thomas Taschereau (1778–1832), Canadian politician and judge
 Jean-Thomas Taschereau (judge) (1814–1893), Canadian jurist, his son